Pilling Always Pays is a 1954 family saga novel by the British writer Thomas Armstrong. It is the second in the Crowther Chronicles and the sequel to his 1940 bestseller The Crowthers of Bankdam. It follows the further adventures of the Crowther family of mill owners now led in the 1930s by Sam Pilling, the grandson of Simeon Crowther. A review in News Chronicle described it as being "as good as The Crowthers of Bankdam". Two further novels in the series Sue Crowther's Marriage and Our London Office were published.

It was named as a best seller for the week in The West Australian newspaper on 24 December 1954.

References

Bibliography
 Alfred, Thomas. Sequels: Incorporating Aldred & Parker's 'Sequel Stories'''. Association of Assistant Librarians , 1955.
 Snell, Keith. The Bibliography of Regional Fiction in Britain and Ireland, 1800–2000''. Routledge, 2017.

1954 British novels
Novels by Thomas Armstrong
Novels set in Yorkshire
William Collins, Sons books
Sequel novels
Novels set in the 1930s